The Oliana olive is an olive cultivar from Spain. It originated from a hybridization between Arbequina and Arbosana obt. 1998 by Agromillora Group.

Overall Evaluation

 A variety with less vigour for the Super High Density system.
 Natural benefit: ease of pruning renovation.
 High yield and exceptionally early production.
 Late ripening, between that of Arbequina and Arbosana.
 Tolerant to leaf spot disease and more suitable for low temperatures than Arbequina.

Overall Oil profile

Corresponds to a sweet type of virgin oil, well balanced and with good harmony at the aromatic level. Presents a medium to high level of fruitiness, light in bitterness and somewhat more intense in spiciness, making it highly suitable for the mass consumer market.

References

Olive cultivars